= Tangshan College =

College in Hebei, China

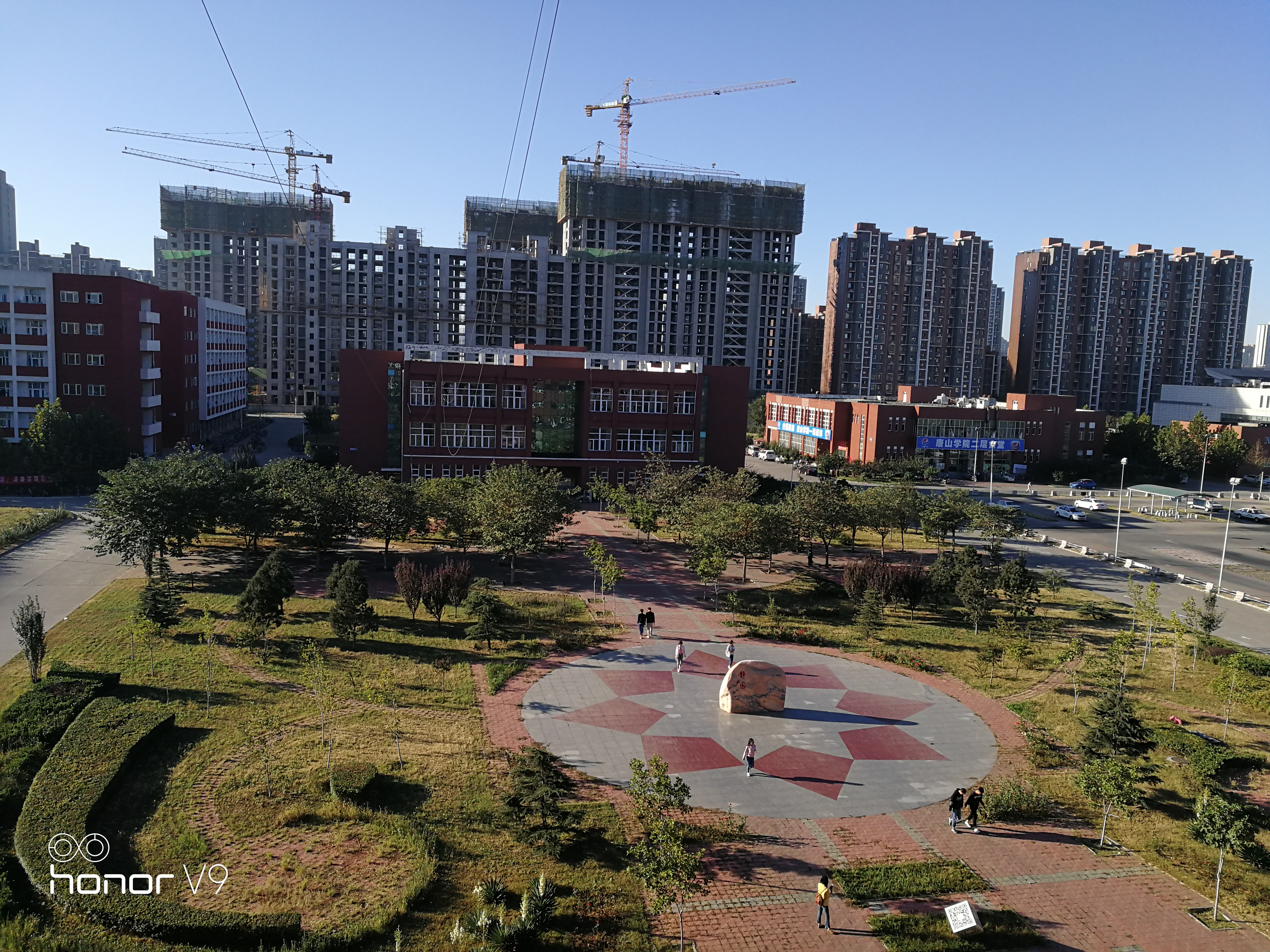
Tangshan University West campus

Tangshan College (Chinese: 唐山学院; pinyin: Tángshān Xuéyuàn) is a college in Hebei, China under the provincial government. It is also known as "Tangshan University".
